The Gold of the Aztecs is a 1990 video game published by U.S. Gold.

Gameplay
The Gold of the Aztecs is a game in which Special Forces veteran Bret Conrad explores an Aztec tomb.

Reception
Peter Olafson reviewed the game for Computer Gaming World, and stated that "as with any good game, players will learn the ways of The Gold of the Aztecs because they will want to and the game's conventions will quickly become second nature. Once this occurs, action gamers simply cannot help but fall for it... and fall... and fall... and fall."

Tom Malcom for Info gave the game three stars and said "I suppose I might like it better if I practiced enough to get used to the lethargic controls, but I'd rather not."

John Davison jnr for Page 6 said "I was not entirely impressed with Gold of the Aztecs. The graphics and sound are quite good, but the game is far from original and it is practically unplayable. I don't particularly like it, but you may well think it's brilliant. It is definitely not worth all the hype which has been spouted about it."

Reviews
Atari ST User - Nov, 1990
Computer and Video Games - Sep, 1990
Raze - Nov, 1990
ST Format - Nov, 1990
Amiga Action - Oct, 1990
Amiga Power - May, 1991
ASM (Aktueller Software Markt) - Nov, 1990
Power Play - 1990-09

References

1990 video games
Amiga games
Atari ST games
Aztecs in fiction
DOS games
Platform games
Video games based on Native American mythology
Video games developed in the United Kingdom
Video games set in Mexico